Flaveria vaginata is a very rare Mexican plant species of Flaveria within the family Asteraceae. It has been found only in two locations in central Mexico, one in northwestern Oaxaca, the other in southwestern Puebla.

Flaveria vaginata  is distinguished from related species in the genus by its dense woolly pubescence on the upper leaves, and by the fact that the flower heads are concentrated into dense hemispherical clumps.

References 

vaginata
Endemic flora of Mexico
Flora of Oaxaca
Flora of Puebla
Plants described in 1978